Amazing Grace is a 1974 American comedy film directed by Stan Lathan and starring Moms Mabley and Moses Gunn. The film's title is a play on words based on the name of the Christian hymn "Amazing Grace".

Plot
Grace (Moms Mabley) is a widow who influences the local mayoral election in Baltimore, Maryland, after she discovers her somewhat slow-witted neighbor Welton J. Waters (Moses Gunn) is being used to run for mayor by shady politicians and the incumbent mayor to further his own self-serving reelection efforts. 

Grace knows the politicians have no interest in the betterment of the neighborhood and are only interested in getting their hands on the money that comes into it. She organizes some of the people in the community, and together they devise a plan to thwart the crooked politician’s schemes.

Cast
 Moms Mabley as Grace Teasdale Grimes
 Slappy White as Forthwirth Wilson
 Moses Gunn as Welton J. Waters
 Rosalind Cash as Creola Waters
 James Karen as Annenburg

Production
Mabley suffered a heart attack during filming,  but had a pacemaker implanted and returned to complete the filming three weeks after the attack. This film is marked as Mabley's final appearance on screen. The film also featured cameo appearances by veteran actors Butterfly McQueen and Stepin Fetchit.

Release
Originally released on August 30, 1974 by United Artists, the film is available on DVD from MGM, and on Blu-Ray from Olive Films.

References

External links
 

1974 films
1974 comedy films
Films set in Maryland
Films shot in Baltimore
United Artists films
American comedy films
1974 directorial debut films
1970s English-language films
Films directed by Stan Lathan
1970s American films